Minsan Lang Kitang Iibigin is a 1994 Filipino drama film directed by Chito S. Roño. The film stars Maricel Soriano, Gabby Concepcion and Zsa Zsa Padilla. It is one of the films restored by the ABS-CBN Film Restoration Project.

In 2021, Maricel's line "Huwag mo akong ma-Terry Terry!" became a trend on the internet.

Plot
The close friendship between Terry (Maricel) and Monique (Zsa Zsa) is tested when the latter falls in love with Terry's husband Dave (Gabby).

Cast
 Maricel Soriano as Terry
 Gabby Concepcion as Dave
 Zsa Zsa Padilla as Monique
 Mat Ranillo III as Alex
 Rina Reyes as Linda
 Mandy Ochoa as Brando
 John Villar as Tirso
 Nanette Medved as Dave's Girlfriend

Awards

References

External links

1994 films
1994 drama films
Filipino-language films
Philippine drama films
Moviestars Production films
Star Cinema films